Lykke Friis (born 27 October 1969) is Prorector for Education at the University of Copenhagen and is a former Danish politician for the party Venstre and former Minister for Climate and Energy and equal rights. Prior to her political career she has once before been Prorector at the University of Copenhagen and held the position from 2006 - 2009.  Prior to her appointment as government minister, she was not a member of Venstre.

Early life and education
Friis is the daughter of a Danish father and a German mother. She graduated from Øregaard Gymnasium and has studied political science at the University of Copenhagen. Lykke Friis obtained her M.Sc. in Economics and Political Science from London School of Economics in 1992, followed by a M.Sc. in political science from University of Copenhagen in 1993. She got a PhD in international politics from the University of Copenhagen in 1997. Eisenhower Fellowships selected Lykke Friis in 2002 to represent Denmark.

Career
Friis has worked as an academic in the Ministry of Economic and Business Affairs, and as a researcher in Dansk Udenrigspolitisk Institut. From 2003 until 2006, she was head of European Politics in the Confederation of Danish Industries. She has taught at both the University of Copenhagen Faculty of Social Sciences and at Copenhagen Business School in international relations.

During her time as minister, Friis presided over the 2009 United Nations Climate Change Conference in Copenhagen. In 2011, she oversaw the Danish government's plan to wean itself off coal, oil and natural gas by 2050 by boosting energy efficiency and the use of renewable energy sources.

Friis has contributed to newspapers, radio, TV, and seminars on EU-related issues, and has written a number of articles and books and such subjects. Her ability to make the EU material accessible secured her the Danmarks Radio Rosenkjærprisen in 2008.

Other activities

Corporate boards
 Vestas, Member of the Board of Directors (2014-2018)

Non-profit organizations
 Danish Foreign Policy Society, Chairwoman of the Board of Directors
 Rockwool Fonden, Member of the Board of Directors
 European Council on Foreign Relations (ECFR), Co-chair (since 2019)
 Trilateral Commission, Member of the European Group
 International Crisis Group (ICG), Board of Trustees (since 2012)

Personal life 
Friis is known as a connoisseur of German football and is a fan of FC Bayern Munich.

Notes

External links
 

1969 births
Living people
Government ministers of Denmark
Danish people of German descent
Academic staff of Copenhagen Business School
Women's ministers
Danish Ministers of Climate and Energy
Venstre (Denmark) politicians
Danish women academics
Members of the Folketing 2011–2015